A referendum on electoral reform took place by mail-in ballot between October 22 and December 7, 2018, in the Canadian province of British Columbia. 61.3 percent of voters supported maintaining the first-past-the-post voting system rather than switching to a proportional representation voting system, which was supported by 38.7 percent of voters. This was British Columbia's third referendum on electoral reform, following ones in 2005 and 2009.

Voters were asked two questions: first, what electoral system should be used to determine election results—the existing first-past-the-post (FPTP) system or a proportional representation (PR) system; and second, what type of proportional voting system should be used if PR were chosen. In the second question, voters were asked to rank three proportional representation voting systems: dual-member proportional representation, mixed-member proportional representation, and rural–urban proportional representation.

The referendum fulfilled an election commitment by the British Columbia New Democratic Party (NDP) during the 2017 election. Their platform promised a referendum and that the government would actively campaign for electoral reform. Results were released by Elections BC on December 20, 2018.

Background
BC has a long history of changing its electoral system. For BC's first election in 1871, the majority of ridings were elected using an "at large" system. This is the way city councillors are elected in BC to this day: a voter gets as many votes as there were people to be elected in the riding.

Over its history, BC modified its electoral system at least 15 times without a referendum. It previously used an alternative voting system in the 1952 provincial election before abolishing it and reestablishing the previous mix of "at large" and first-past-the-post. The first BC election done entirely under first-past-the-post came in 1991, after the last "at-large" voting districts had been abolished. The multi-member at-large ridings were abolished after the 1986 election due to a Supreme Court of Canada ruling that found them unconstitutional.

Previous referendums
Before the 2001 provincial election, the BC Liberal Party committed to appoint a Citizens' Assembly to investigate electoral reform, hold consultations, and prepare a report recommending whether a different electoral system should be adopted. The commitment was driven in part by the anomalous provincial election result in 1996, in which the BC New Democratic Party won reelection as a majority government with 39.5% of the vote and 39 seats, despite gaining a 3% smaller share of the popular vote than the Liberals at 41.8%, which translated into 33 Liberal seats. In December 2004, the Assembly released its report recommending that the province adopt BC-STV, a BC-specific variant of the single transferable vote (STV) system. On May 17, 2005, a referendum was held in conjunction with the 2005 general election, in which voters were asked whether the province should adopt the recommendation of the Assembly to replace the first-past-the-post electoral system with BC-STV, or maintain the current system. While 57.7% of the electorate voted in favour of BC-STV, including a majority of voters in 77 of 79 ridings, its support failed to reach the 60% threshold set by the government and it was not adopted.

Following the 2005 referendum, British Columbia held a second referendum on electoral reform in conjunction with the provincial election on May 12, 2009. It was the most recent referendum on electoral reform that has been held in British Columbia. As in 2005, voters in 2009 were asked to provide their opinions on the BC-STV electoral system proposed by the British Columbia Citizen's Assembly on Electoral Reform to ensure more proportional representation in the provincial Legislative Assembly. British Columbians were asked which electoral system should be used to elect legislators: the existing first-past-the-post electoral system or the proposed BC-STV system.

The adoption of BC-STV in the 2009 referendum was defeated, with 60.9% voting against the reform and 39.09% of voters supporting the change.

Intervening federal developments
During the 2015 federal election, Justin Trudeau and the Liberal Party of Canada campaigned on the promise that it would be the last federal election under the first-past-the-post electoral system. The party's platform stated that a Liberal government would form an all-party Parliamentary committee, and introduce legislation within 18 months enacting electoral reform. On December 1, 2016, the House of Commons of Canada Special Committee on Electoral Reform released its report recommending Canada hold a referendum to adopt a proportional representation voting system for federal elections. Several months later, the government announced that it was no longer pursuing electoral reform.

Origin of third referendum
During the 2017 provincial election, both the NDP and the Green Party campaigned for PR and included the policy in their election platforms. On May 29, 2017, approximately three weeks after the election resulted in a BC Liberal minority government, the NDP and Green caucuses signed a supply and confidence agreement. The agreement included a section on PR, in which the parties agreed to put the issue to a referendum and that both parties would actively campaign for PR in the referendum. On June 22, 2017, the Liberal government tabled its throne speech, adopting the opposition parties' policy to hold a third referendum on electoral reform. On June 29, 2017, the BC Liberal government was defeated in a confidence vote. Lieutenant Governor Judith Guichon then invited the NDP to form a minority government with Green support. On November 30, 2017, the Electoral Reform Referendum 2018 Act was passed into law. It required the referendum to be held and authorized Cabinet to make various regulations.

Consultation and implementation
Between November 2017 and February 2018, Attorney General David Eby conducted a public consultation entitled "How We Vote". On May 30, 2018, he released the report on the consultation and recommendations concerning how the referendum process should be conducted. Cabinet accepted the recommendations shortly thereafter, in early June. Later in June, Vote PR BC launched their campaign for proportional representation, canvassing in cities across the province.

Elections BC reviewed the referendum questions in June. On June 18, Chief Electoral Officer Anton Boegman wrote to the Speaker of the Legislative Assembly advising that in his view both questions were simple and clear enough for voters to understand. He also made recommendations for small changes to the questions.  On June 22, 2018, the government released the regulations governing the referendum. The regulations adopted the changes to the question proposed by the Chief Electoral Officer, and set down other rules governing the campaign.

ICBA lawsuit

On June 28, 2018, the Independent Contractors and Business Association (ICBA)—a lobby group for the construction industry— filed a lawsuit seeking an injunction to stop the referendum, or alternatively, to strike down the campaign financing rules governing the referendum. The lawsuit contains various complaints about the process, the referendum, and the systems on the ballot. In response, NDP MLA Bob D'Eith called the lawsuit an attempt to stop people from having a choice in their electoral system, and said ICBA does not want "ordinary people to have a stronger voice in the elections and I think they're desperate to hang on to the status quo". The Ministry of the Attorney General defended the legislation in court. The official campaign began July 1, 2018.

On July 17, 2018, ICBA's court application for an early trial date was dismissed by Justice Miriam Gropper of the British Columbia Supreme Court, in order to allow the government time to respond. Following the hearing, ICBA's lawyer, Peter Gall, told reporters ICBA would be seeking an interim injunction.

On July 24, ICBA filed an application seeking an interim injunction to halt campaign financing rules and prevent ballots from being counted. The application was heard by Justice Gropper on August 7. In her decision handed down several weeks later, she dismissed the application calling ICBA's allegations about the referendum "rhetoric", "conjecture" and "exaggeration". In mid-September, the ICBA announced that they would be seeking leave to appeal Justice Gropper's ruling on the interim injunction. That same month, the British Columbia Government and Service Employees' Union was granted intervenor status by the court, siding against the ICBA.

The appeal of Justice Gropper's judgement concerning the interim injunction was heard on November 2. Justice Fitch of the British Columbia Court of Appeal dismissed the appeal, finding that there was no merit to the ICBA's argument.

Ballot structure and details
Voters were asked two questions in the referendum. The first revolved around what electoral system should be used to determine election results: the existing first-past-the-post system or a proportional representation system. The second question explored what type of proportional voting system should be used if PR is chosen. This involved voters ranking three proportional representation voting systems: dual-member proportional representation, mixed-member proportional representation, and rural–urban proportional representation.

Question 1: Which system should British Columbia use for provincial elections? (Vote for only one.)
The current First Past the Post voting system
A proportional representation voting system
Question 2: If British Columbia adopts a proportional representation voting system, which of the following voting systems do you prefer? (Rank in order of preference. You may choose to support one, two or all three of the systems.)
Dual-member proportional (DMP)
Mixed-member proportional (MMP)
Rural–urban proportional (RUP)

Proportional voting systems on the ballot
The referendum asked voters to rank three proportional representation voting systems in order of preference: Voters ranked one, two, or all three systems.
 dual-member proportional representation (DMP)
 mixed-member proportional representation (MMP)
 rural–urban proportional representation (RUP)

Dual-member proportional (DMP)
Dual-member proportional is an electoral system designed to produce proportional election results across a region by electing two representatives in each of the region's districts. The first seat in every district is awarded to the candidate who receives the most votes, similar to first-past-the-post voting. The second seat is awarded to one of the remaining district candidates so that proportionality is achieved across the region, using a calculation that aims to award parties their seats in the districts where they had their strongest performances.

DMP was invented in 2013 by a University of Alberta mathematics student named Sean Graham. The system was intended as a possible replacement for first-past-the-post voting in Canadian national and provincial elections. Whereas campaigns to adopt MMP representation or the single transferable vote had recently been defeated in a number of Canadian provinces (such as the 2005 and 2009 British Columbia referendums, the 2005 Prince Edward Island referendum, and the 2007 Ontario referendum), the intent behind DMP was to gain broader acceptance by retaining salient features of first-past-the-post voting. These features include a one-vote ballot, relatively small districts (compared with STV), and a single tier of local representatives (in contrast to MMP).

Mixed-member proportional
Mixed-member proportional is a mixed electoral system in which voters get two votes: one to decide the representative for their single-seat constituency, and one for a political party. Seats in the legislature are filled firstly by candidates in local ridings, and secondly, by party candidates based on the percentage of nationwide or region-wide votes that each party received.

In 2004, MMP was recommended by the Law Commission of Canada to be adopted for federal elections. In 2007, Ontario held a provincial referendum to adopt the system, which failed to pass. In 2016, Prince Edward Island (PEI) voted to adopt MMP in a non-binding referendum. PEI held another referendum on the issue during the 2019 provincial election and narrowly voted against MMP.

A form of MMP is used for national elections in New Zealand and Germany, and in the United Kingdom for elections to the devolved parliaments of Scotland and Wales (where the system is referred to as the Additional Member System).

Rural–urban proportional (RUP)

Rural–urban proportional is a hybrid-proportional system designed by Fair Vote Canada to meet the challenges of Canada's geography. As put forward for the BC referendum, it would use mixed-member proportional representation (MMP) in rural areas and the single transferable vote (STV) in urban and semi-urban areas. Sweden, Denmark and Iceland use voting models with similar hybrid approaches. In Canada from the 1920s to the 1950s, the provinces of Alberta and Manitoba used a hybrid rural–urban system where STV was used in large cities and the alternative vote was used in single-member rural districts.

The hybrid approach taken by rural–urban proportional reflects lessons learned from previous attempts to pass electoral reform. A major advantage of rural–urban proportional as designed is that it requires creating far fewer top-up seats to achieve proportionality than MMP. Under rural–urban PR, no more than 10–15% of seats – versus 40% of seats under MMP – would need to be set aside as top-up seats to achieve proportionality, because the results from the urban and semi-urban areas would already be proportional owing to their voting having been conducted using STV.

For rural areas, rural–urban proportional is advantageous because existing first-past-the-post rural ridings need to grow only 15% larger to facilitate extra regional top-up seats under it, compared to 67% larger if MMP was chosen or double in size if DMP was chosen.

RUP is the only PR system of the three that lets voters rank individual candidates in order by preference. The use of STV ranked ballots means that all candidates must compete with one another for enough votes to win, including candidates running for the same party. Voters can rank long-shot independent candidates or candidates from unpopular parties first without fear of wasting their vote, because votes for badly performing candidates will be transferred during countingbased on the voter's next preferenceto another candidate until all seats are won.

In its scorecard of proportional voting systems, Fair Voting BC gave rural–urban proportional its highest ranking. During the Canadian government's 2016 consultation on electoral reform at the federal level, both the New Democratic Party of Canada and Green Party of Canada recommended Canada adopt either RUP or MMP.

Campaign
The official campaign began July 1, 2018. Groups had until July 6 to apply to Elections BC to be named the official proponent or opponent groups and receive $500,000 in public funding.  On July 12, Elections BC announced that Vote PR BC would be the official proponent group and No BC Proportional Representation Society would be the official opponent group. Other individuals, groups and political parties are permitted to register as referendum advertisers with Elections BC, but are not eligible for public funds.

The NDP and Green Party campaigned for proportional representation. Sonia Furstenau, a Green MLA, held town halls about electoral reform in cities across the province in July and August. BC Premier John Horgan launched the NDP's referendum campaign in early September, saying "Proportional representation means exactly what it says. Whatever proportion, or share, of the vote a party wins, they get that many seats in government." Andrew Wilkinson, BC Liberal leader, opposed the referendum and a change to a proportional representation system.

Elections BC mailed a referendum information card to every household in the province between September 10 and 28, and a voter's guide between October 15 and 26. Voters received their referendum voting package in the mail between October 22 and November 2. In early September, the members of the Canadian Union of Postal Workers voted in favour of job action. The strike resulted in Elections BC extending the voting deadline by a week.

In early November, Horgan announced that he had cast his ballot for proportional representation, and that his first choice was MMP.  Vote PR BC, the official proponent group, flew Andrew Coyne to Vancouver to give a talk endorsing PR, where Coyne announced he supported Rural–Urban Proportional.

Debate 
In late September, Andrew Wilkinson challenged John Horgan to a debate concerning the referendum, a challenge which Horgan accepted. The debate took place on November 8 at 7:00pm. It was broadcast on CBC News and Global News.

Official campaign organizations
Official campaign organizations include the official proponent and opponent groups along with referendum advertising sponsors.

Official proponent and opponent groups

 Proponent: Vote PR BC
 Opponent: No BC Proportional Representation Society

Referendum advertising sponsors
 Asian Environmental Association
 British Columbia Conservative Party
 British Columbia Government and Service Employees' Union
 British Columbia Liberal Party
 British Columbia New Democratic Party
 Committee for Voting Equity in BC
 Communist Party of British Columbia
 Dogwood Initiative
 Fair Vote Canada BC
 Fraser Valley East Against Proportional Representation
 Green Party Political Association of British Columbia
 KnowB4UVote.com Society
 LeadNow
 No Pro Rep Fraser Valley East 
 Rural–Urban Proportional for BC
 Wake Up BC
 Wildsight
 Wise Vote BC
 YES or NO, Rural Urban First

Voting period extension
On November 23, 2018, due to a postal strike, Elections BC extended the voting period deadline by a week – from November 30, 2018, to December 7, 2018. The deadline to register to vote remained midnight on November 23, 2018. Voters who were sent a voting package but did not receive it, or who need a replacement voting package, could request a replacement package up to December 7. All ballots must have been received by Elections BC by 4:30pm on December 7. In response to a question from a constituent on Twitter, Elections BC clarified that ballots received by Elections BC's Referendum Service Offices or Service BC Centres up to and including 4:30pm on December 7, 2018, but which had not been physically transferred to Elections BC's counting centre, would be accepted and counted as valid ballots.

Post-referendum plans

The government had plans for the required next steps had proportional representation passed. However, as it did not pass, the government did not implement any of these.  Had a proportional system been adopted, the independent BC Electoral Boundaries Commission would have determined the number and location of new electoral districts. A legislative committee would have been tasked with determining whether the number of members of the Legislative Assembly should increase, and if so by how many (to a maximum of an additional eight). Some other aspects of how the new system would have worked would have also needed to be determined by a legislative committee.

If a form of proportional representation had been adopted, the government had also committed to holding a further confirming referendum after two general elections. Voters in that future referendum would have had the option of maintaining the form of proportional representation adopted or switching back to the first-past-the-post electoral system. On October 2, 2018, the government introduced legislation to enact the requirement for this second referendum into law. If a change from the first-past-the-post system had been adopted in 2018, the bill would have required a second referendum on electoral reform to occur within 13 months of the second provincial general election held under the chosen proportional representation voting system (no later than November 30, 2026). As voters decided to keep the existing first-past-the-post system, this second referendum will not take place.

Opinion polls

Question 1

Referendum-style binary questionQuestion: "Based on what you know, please indicate which of these two broad options you prefer for BC"

Multiple choice question allowing undecideds and opt-outs (options 3–5 will not be present on ballot)Question: "Based on how you feel right now, if you were to receive a voting package, which way would you vote on the first question?"

Question 2

Results

On December 20, 2018, Elections BC announced that 61.3% of ballots were cast to maintain the first-past-the-post voting system.

A total of 1,391,423 ballots were considered. There were 1,378,753 valid votes for Question 1, and 831,760 valid votes for Question 2. 2,461 ballots were rejected.

Question 1

The existing first-past-the-post voting system received a majority of votes with 61.30% (845,235) of the valid votes for Question 1. As a result, no electoral reform was approved.

Question 1: Which system should British Columbia use for provincial elections?

Question 2

Per the Electoral Reform Referendum 2018 Regulation, STV rules were in effect to find the winner in Question 2 (although the question was moot as no electoral reform would take place as per the result of Question 1). Thus, when no system won a majority of first preferences, a second round of counting was required for Question 2. RUP had the fewest first preferences, so it was eliminated and its votes were transferred to the second preferences marked on the ballots. In the second count, the mixed-member proportional voting system had the most support on Question 2.

Question 2: If British Columbia adopts a proportional representation voting system, which of the following voting systems do you prefer?

References

External links
 How We Vote Consultation website
 Elections BC Referendum 2018 website
 Official voting results – from Elections BC
 Vote PR BC – Official proponent group
 No Pro Rep – Official opponent group

2018 in British Columbia
2018 referendums
October 2018 events in Canada
November 2018 events in Canada
Referendums in British Columbia
Multiple-choice referendums
Electoral reform referendums in Canada